Lord Peter Wimsey is a series of full cast BBC Radio drama adaptations of Dorothy L. Sayers's Lord Peter Wimsey detective novels broadcast on BBC Radio 4 between 1973 and 1983, with a further adaptation of Gaudy Night mounted for BBC Audiobooks in 2005 to complete the full sequence of Sayers' novels, all starring Ian Carmichael in the title role.

Cast and crew
The series stars Ian Carmichael as aristocratic sleuth Lord Peter Wimsey. Carmichael played the role concurrently in five BBC Television adaptations beginning with Clouds of Witness in April 1972. Peter Jones played Wimsey's loyal valet and assistant Mervyn Bunter in all original adaptations, and also dramatised Clouds of Witness with Tania Lieven. Gabriel Woolf featured as Inspector Charles Parker, Lord Peter's friend and contact at Scotland Yard (later brother-in-law) in three adaptations. Mystery writer Harriet Vane was played by Ann Bell (Strong Poison), Maria Aitken (Have His Carcase) and Sarah Badel (Busman's Honeymoon) in the original sequence and Joanna David in Gaudy Night.

The first six productions were directed by Simon Brett, who became a crime writer himself following his involvement with the series, with the next four directed by Martin Fisher. Gaudy Night, missing from the original sequence, was directed for BBC Audiobooks in 2005 by Enyd Williams and was later broadcast on BBC Radio 7 in 2010.

List of adaptations

Reception
Caroline Crampton reviewing a 2016 repeat of Have His Carcase in the New Statesman notes that "Ian Carmichael is Peter Wimsey...Somehow, the Hull-born Carmichael inhabits the character of Wimsey – the Eton and Oxford educated younger son of a Duke who turns to mystery-solving after traumatic experiences in the First World War – better than any of the others who tried over the course of the twentieth century...Just as Wimsey’s buffoonish, aristocratic utterances conceal a vulnerable, perceptive intellect, so does the old-fashioned style of this drama hide a darker, more difficult story." David Hepworth in The Guardian notes that Carmichael "was put on this earth to play two great heroes of popular fiction: Bertie Wooster and Lord Peter Wimsey."

Director and producer Simon Brett credits the series with inspiring him to become a crime novelist and his actor-sleuth character Charles Paris. He recalls:

See also
Lord Peter Wimsey (TV series)
Hercule Poirot (radio series)
Miss Marple (radio series)
Sherlock Holmes (1989 radio series)

References

External links

BBC Radio 4 programmes
Lists of radio series episodes
Detective radio shows